o-Toluic acid, also 2-methylbenzoic acid, is an aromatic carboxylic acid, with formula (CH3)C6H4(COOH). It is an isomer of p-toluic acid and m-toluic acid. When purified and recrystallized, o-toluic acid forms needle-shaped crystals. o-Toluic acid was first noticed by Sir William Ramsay, credited discoverer of the noble gases and winner of the 1904 Nobel Prize in Chemistry.

o-Toluic acid is prepared by oxidation of o-xylene with nitric acid.

References 

Benzoic acids